Gabriel Soares de Sousa (1540–1591) was a Portuguese explorer and naturalist. A participant in Francisco Barretos Africa expeditions, he settled in the Portuguese colony of Brazil living there for seventeen years. He wrote Tratado Descritivo do Brasil  (A Descriptive Treatise of Brazil), published in 1587. This part encyclopaedia and part personal narrative describes flora and cultivated plants, gives an account of the culture of cotton, the medicinal qualities of tobacco and the so-called “trees reaes” or royal trees, trees of commercial value. It also covers native tribes. In 1591 he led an expedition along the São Francisco River.

References
 This article incorporates text from História da Literatura Brasileira, de José Veríssimo, in public domain.
 "Brasiliana da Biblioteca Nacional", Rio de Janeiro, 2001.
 Gaspar, Lúcia. Viajantes em terras brasileiras - Documentos existentes no acervo da Biblioteca Central Blanche Knopf. Fundação Joaquim Nabuco. Recife.

External links
 Souza, Gabriel Soaares de.  Tratado Descritivo do Brazil em 1587.  São Paulo: Companhia Editora Nacional, 1938.

1540 births
1591 deaths
Portuguese naturalists
Portuguese Renaissance writers
Portuguese explorers of South America
16th-century explorers
16th-century Portuguese people
Portuguese colonization of the Americas